Pigment Yellow 13 is an organic compound and an azo compound.  It is a widely used yellow pigment.  It is also classified as a diarylide pigment, being derived from 3,3'-dichlorobenzidine.  It is closely related to Pigment Yellow 12, wherein the two xylyl groups are replaced by phenyl.

References

Pigments
Organic pigments
Shades of yellow
Diarylide pigments